Leppäkorpi may refer to:

 Leppäkorpi (Pori), a district in Pori, Finland
 Leppäkorpi (Vantaa), a district in Vantaa, Finland
 Leppäkorpi (Nummi), a village in Lohja, Finland